Stuart Township may refer to:

 Stuart Township, Guthrie County, Iowa
 Stuart Township, Holt County, Nebraska

See also
 Stuart (disambiguation)

Township name disambiguation pages